The 1974 AFC Youth Championship was held in Bangkok, Thailand. India and Iran shared the title after the final ended in a 2–2 Draw.This was also the last tournament South Vietnam particpated, one year later in 30 April 1975 South Vietnam was annexationed by North Vietnam.

Group stage

Group A

Group B

Group C

Group D

Knockout stage

Quarter-finals

Semi-finals

Third place playoff

Final

References

AFC U-19 Championship
1974
Youth
1974 in Thai sport
1974 in youth association football